The South Africa national women's cricket team toured England in 2003, playing two Test matches and three women's One Day Internationals.
England won both series, the Test by 1–0 (with one match finishing as a drawn) and the ODI by 2–1.

Test series

1st Test

2nd Test

One Day International series

1st ODI

2nd ODI

3rd ODI

Tour matches

References

2003 in South African cricket
2003 in English cricket
Women's cricket tours of England
England
2003 in English women's sport
2003 in South African women's sport
2003 in women's cricket
International cricket competitions in 2003
South African cricket tours of England
July 2003 sports events in the United Kingdom
August 2003 sports events in the United Kingdom